is a former Japanese football player.

Playing career
Koishi was born in Tosu on August 22, 1977. After graduating from Rissho University, he joined the J2 League club Sagan Tosu based in his local area in 2000. He played often as a forward during his first season. In 2003, he played as an offensive midfielder. However he was not played in 2005. In 2006, he moved to the Japan Football League club ALO's Hokuriku. He retired at the end of the 2006 season.

Club statistics

References

External links

1977 births
Living people
Rissho University alumni
Association football people from Saga Prefecture
Japanese footballers
J2 League players
Japan Football League players
Sagan Tosu players
Kataller Toyama players
Association football midfielders